"Amazed" is a song by American country music group Lonestar, released on March 22, 1999, to country radio as the second single from their third studio album Lonely Grill (1999). The power ballad is the band's longest-lasting number one single and biggest hit, spending eight weeks at the top of the Billboard country chart. The song was written by Marv Green, Aimee Mayo, and Chris Lindsey. A pop remix of the song reached number one on the Billboard Hot 100 and number two on the Hot Adult Contemporary Tracks charts in 2000. The song has sold over 1,650,000 digital copies in the US as of February 2016.

Only five years after Lonestar's "Amazed" topped the Billboard Hot 100 did another country song top the chart, as Carrie Underwood's "Inside Your Heaven" debuted at number one on the Hot 100 in 2005, making it one of just two songs to top the Hot 100 since 2000.

Since the release of the original, the song has been covered by Bonnie Tyler, Duncan James, and Fady Maalouf, all of whom have released their respective versions as singles. Ben Mills, Boyz II Men and Shane Filan of Westlife have included covers in their respective albums. On The Sing-Off (season 4, episode 3), judge Shawn Stockman, of Boyz II Men fame, mentioned that the song had been offered to them first, and they decided to turn it down.

Content
The song was written by songwriters Marv Green, Aimee Mayo, and Chris Lindsey. At the time of the songwriting, Mayo and Lindsey had begun dating and drew inspiration from their romance for the song. Mayo said "Our feelings for each other just started coming out as we were writing." "Amazed" was then given to Lonestar for their 1999 album Lonely Grill and released as the album's lead single. The song is in the key of A♭ major with a vocal range from F3 to A♭4.

The song reached number one on the Billboard Hot Country Singles & Tracks and remained there for eight consecutive weeks until it was knocked off by "Single White Female" by Chely Wright. With this accomplishment, it set a record for the longest run at number one on the country chart since Nielsen Broadcast Data Systems was initiated in 1990. This run was later tied by Alan Jackson and Jimmy Buffett's 2003 single "It's Five O'Clock Somewhere", and later surpassed by Morgan Wallen's "You Proof" in 2022, which spent ten non-consecutive weeks at number one. "Amazed" spent 41 weeks on the country singles chart, giving it the second-longest chart run of any country single in the 1990s. In addition, the single crossed over into the pop airwaves entering the Billboard Hot 100 at number 81. It peaked at number 24 before falling off the Hot 100.

The song was then remixed for pop radio (a tactic commonly used to present country-leaning songs to mainstream audiences) by Brian Tankersley, who redid the entire backing track with session musicians and added a new key change to D major for the final chorus and A minor for the outro; also having lead singer Richie McDonald re-record his vocals for the final portion of the remix in the new key. The new mix's popularity prompted the single to re-enter the Hot 100 at number 45. On this second chart run, it hit number one on March 4, 2000. In doing so, it became the first power ballad to top the chart since Aerosmith's "I Don't Want to Miss a Thing" in 1998, as well as the first new country song to top the pop charts since Kenny Rogers and Dolly Parton's 1983 duet "Islands in the Stream". It also made Lonestar the first country band to place a song in the top ten of the Hot 100 year-end countdown. All remixes of the song made the single spend a combined total of 55 weeks in the Hot 100, and 41 weeks on Hot Country Singles & Tracks. It had sold 1,628,000 digital copies in the US as of December 2015.

Only five years after "Amazed" topped the Billboard Hot 100 did another country song top the chart, as Carrie Underwood's "Inside Your Heaven" debuted at number one on the Hot 100, in June 2005. "Amazed" and "Inside Your Heaven" are the only country songs in the 2000s decade to hit number one on the Hot 100.

In the United Kingdom, "Amazed" reached a peak of number 21 and spent 22 weeks in the charts. It spent 17 weeks in the top 40 without ever breaking into the top 20.

Critical reception
A review in Billboard was mostly favorable, praising Richie McDonald's lead vocals for "perfectly convey[ing] the tenderness and wonder felt in a loving relationship" but saying that some of the lyrics were "a little too clichéd".

Music video
Trey Fanjoy directed the music video for Lonestar's rendition. It premiered on CMT on July 20, 1999. It features the band performing the song in a dark room, and a model making seductive poses. The model is portrayed by Sunny Mabrey. This was the first video that Lonestar members do not wear cowboy hats, and Keech Rainwater no longer has long hair. The original music video uses the album version for country channels; a second video was created from the footage for the song's pop remix and served to international and pop stations.

Track listings

US CD and cassette single
 "Amazed" (Captain mix)
 "Amazed" (AC mix)

US 7-inch single 1
A. "Amazed" – 4:00
B. "Tell Her" – 3:26

US 7-inch single 2
A. "Smile" – 3:30
B. "Amazed" – 4:00

Australian CD single
 "Amazed"
 "Amazed" (AC mix)

UK CD1 and cassette single
 "Amazed" (Captain mix) – 4:29
 "Amazed" (Huff mix) – 4:02
 "Amazed" (acoustic mix) – 3:58

UK CD2
 "Amazed" (mainstream mix)
 "Amazed" (Huff mix)
 "Amazed" (mainstream mix acoustic version)

European CD single
 "Amazed" (Captain mix) – 4:29
 "Amazed" (Huff mix) – 4:02

Charts

Weekly charts

Year-end charts

Release history

Certifications

Duncan James version

"Amazed" was the third and final single released from Future Past, the debut album of Duncan James, member of the English boy band Blue. It was released in the UK on March 12, 2007, but was withdrawn just days later, following James' being dropped from his record label due to poor sales of his previous singles and album. The single was also released in some European countries, such as Germany, where it peaked at number 181 on the German Singles Chart.

Track listings
UK CD single
 "Amazed" (radio edit) – 3:57
 "Save This Moment for Me" – 4:42

Germany CD1
 "Amazed" (radio edit) – 3:57
 "Part Time Love" – 4:01

Germany CD2
 "Amazed" (radio edit) – 3:57
 "You Can" – 3:55
 "Part Time Love" – 4:01
 "Amazed" (video clip) – 3:57

Charts

Fady Maalouf version

In 2008, the runner up of the fifth season of Deutschland sucht den Superstar, the German version of Pop Idol, the Lebanese-German singer Fady Maalouf released a cover version of the song as his second single release immediately after the big success of his debut single "Blessed". The song also appears in his debut Blessed album's double CD rerelease, titled Blessed: New Edition.

Maalouf's version was a hit in Germany where it reached number 26 in the German Singles Chart. It was also released in Austria, reaching number 52 in the Austrian Singles Chart.

Track listings
CD single
 "Amazed" – (3:58)
 "Vole mon ame" – (3:42)

CD maxi
 "Amazed" – (3:58)
 "Vole mon ame" – (3:42)
 "Show Me Your Love" (Dance version) – (4:31)
 "Amazed" (Instrumental) – (3:58)
 "Amazed" (Video)

Charts

References in other media
In 2014, country music duo Haley & Michaels co-wrote their debut single "Just Another Love Song" with Lonestar lead vocalist Richie McDonald. The song makes lyrical reference to "Amazed", and features McDonald singing its chorus.

References

1999 songs
1999 singles
Bertelsmann Music Group singles
Billboard Hot 100 number-one singles
Billboard Hot Country Songs number-one singles of the year
BNA Records singles
Bonnie Tyler songs
Columbia Records singles
Country ballads
Duncan James songs
Fady Maalouf songs
Innocent Records singles
Lonestar songs
Music videos directed by Trey Fanjoy
RPM Country Tracks number-one singles of the year
Song recordings produced by Dann Huff
Songs written by Aimee Mayo
Songs written by Chris Lindsey
Songs written by Marv Green
1990s ballads